Farrokh Khani (also Romanized as Farrokh Khānī; also known as Deh Farokh Khān) is a village in Hasanabad Rural District, in the Central District of Eslamabad-e Gharb County, Kermanshah Province, Iran. At the 2006 census, its population was 230, in 46 families.

References 

Populated places in Eslamabad-e Gharb County